Faruque Banda is a small area between the Tordher and Jehangira, Swabi District. The residents of this area are Baghwanan. The land is very fertile. There are two primary schools one is for boys and the other is for girls. The main crops of the Faruque Banda includes Wheat, Sugar, and Tobacco.

History 

Faruque Banda is owned and is on name of late Khan Ghulam Faruque Khan Khattak of Shaidu.

References 

Populated places in Swabi District